Band of Skulls are an English rock band from Southampton, consisting of Russell Marsden (guitar, vocals) and Emma Richardson (bass, vocals); Matt Hayward (drums; 2002–2016) was previously a member. The group formed after meeting in college, although Marsden and Hayward have been friends since high school. Band of Skulls have released five studio albums, their most recent being Love Is All You Love in April 2019. In November 2022, Russell Marsden took to Instagram to inform fans that Emma Richardson will leave the band to pursue a full-time painting career.

History
Initially, the group played at night clubs in the Greater London area and recorded some demos under the name of 'Fleeing New York' before changing their name briefly to 'Skulls'. Summer of 2008 found the band in the USA where there was already an American band with the same name. In November 2008 they became ' Band of Skulls '. The band's original demos were recorded in Hayward's father's shed-studio.

Band of Skulls' debut album Baby Darling Doll Face Honey, distributed by Shangri-La Music, was released exclusively on the iTunes Store on 6 March 2009, followed by a general release on 20 March. The track "I Know What I Am" was chosen as iTunes' free Single of the Week to coincide with the digital release. The song was also featured in the soundtrack for TV series Friday Night Lights, Volume 2, which was released on 4 May 2010. The song also appeared in Guitar Hero: Warriors of Rock.  Another track that was not actually on the album, "Friends", was included on The Twilight Saga: New Moon soundtrack in November 2009.

On 23 March 2010, Band of Skulls released Friends EP, which includes the studio-recorded version of "Friends", a live version, and a music video of the song.

Band of Skulls played at the SXSW Festival in early 2010 and toured the Midwest in March in support of Black Rebel Motorcycle Club. The band appeared on the French TV show Taratata broadcast in March 2010, where they covered the song "Sympathy for the Devil" by The Rolling Stones with the band John & Jehn. In April 2010, they toured the U.S. and Canada followed by England in May 2010, including a sold-out show at the London Electric Ballroom. On 28 June 2010, Band of Skulls supported The Dead Weather at The Roundhouse in London. In July 2010, the band covered Goldfrapp's "Strict Machine" for Australian radio. They were also one of three bands who opened for Muse on 4 September 2010 at Lancashire County Cricket Ground. In October 2010 they also toured to South Africa to play at the annual Rocking The Daisies festival.

On 26 October 2010, Band of Skulls released a live album called Live on KCRW's Morning Becomes Eclectic, containing an in-studio performance from KCRW radio's Morning Becomes Eclectic program.

On 5 October 2011, the band released "The Devil Takes Care of His Own"—the first single to be taken from the new album—with an accompanying music video. The second studio album Sweet Sour was recorded at Rockfield Studios in Wales. It is produced by Ian Davenport (Supergrass, Badly Drawn Boy), who also produced their debut album, and was released on 20 February 2012 in the UK and Europe and 21 February 2012 in the US.

On 12 April 2012, Channel 4 broadcast a short documentary starring the band. They discuss the formation of Band of Skulls through to going from working the bars of their hometown to playing music in front of expansive crowds of adoring fans across the globe. It is a rare and intimate insight into the world of Band of Skulls, focusing of their success and achievements over the years.

On 20 March 2014, Band of Skulls performed on Late Night with Seth Meyers. The band played "Asleep at the Wheel".

On 22 September 2014, Band of Skulls performed on Later... with Jools Holland playing the title track from their recent album "Himalayan".

Band of Skulls shared new track 'So Good' on 28 April 2016, releasing it on Spotify the same day.

In January 2017, it was announced via social media that Hayward had left the band.

U.S. drummer Julian Dorio filled in on drums for the group's live shows in August 2018.

On 10 April 2019 Band of Skulls premiered video for their song "Love Is All You Love." The video is the third installment in the trilogy ("Cool You Battles" and "We're Alive") using the same central characters as they lose themselves to the music.

Musical style
AllMusic's James Christopher Monger called the band's music "gritty, ferociously heavy indie rock & roll out of the mist of blues history", while Jon O'Brien of the same website observed a "scuzzy garage rock sound".

Discography

Studio albums

Extended plays
 Friends EP (23 March 2010)
 Electric Blues EP (2012)

Live albums
 KCRW's Morning Becomes Eclectic (26 October 2010)
 Live at Brixton (7 December 2012)
 Live at Southampton Guildhall (8 November 2014)

Singles

Collaborations

Awards
Independent Music Awards 2013: "Sweet Sour" – Best Rock/Hard Rock Song

References

External links

 

English alternative rock groups
Musical groups established in 2008
Musical groups from Southampton
British musical trios
Vagrant Records artists
English blues rock musical groups